Adrian Matejka is an American poet.  He was the poet laureate of Indiana for the 2018-2019 term. Since May 2022, he has been the editor of Poetry magazine.

Life 
Born in Nuremberg, Germany, while his family served in the U.S military, Adrian Matejka was raised in Indianapolis, Indiana, in the United States.  He graduated from Indiana University Bloomington and Southern Illinois University Carbondale with an MFA in Creative Writing. He has received fellowships from the Cave Canem Workshop, the Guggenheim Foundation, the Lannan Foundation, the National Endowment for the Arts, and United States Artists.

He is the author of The Devil's Garden and Mixology. His third collection, The Big Smoke, is  about Jack Johnson and was a finalist for the 2013 National Book Award and the 2014 Pulitzer Prize and won an Anisfield-Wolf Book Award. His newest collection, Map to the Stars, was published by Penguin in 2017.

His work has appeared in literary journals and magazines including American Poetry Review, Callaloo, Crab Orchard Review, Gulf Coast, Indiana Review, Poetry, Ploughshares, Prairie Schooner, and in anthologies including From the Fishouse (Persea Books, 2009) <ref>{{cite web|url=http://www.perseabooks.com/detail.php?bookID=47 |title=Persea Books Website > "From the Fishouse Book Page |publisher=Perseabooks.com |date= |accessdate=2014-07-27}}</ref> and The Best American Poetry 2010 (Scribner, 2010).

He teaches literature and creative writing at Indiana University, and was the Indiana State Poet Laureate for 2018 and 2019.  In 2022, he was named editor of Poetry magazine.

Honors and awards
2019 Academy of American Poets Laureate Fellowship
2019 National Endowment for the Arts Fellowship
2018 Bellagio Foundation Residency Fellowship
2015 United States Artists Simon Fellowship
2014 Lannan Literary Fellowship
2014 Guggenheim Fellowship
2014 Anisfield-Wolf Award
2014 Pulitzer Prize, Finalist  
2013 National Book Award, Finalist
 2011 Lannan Foundation Residency Fellowship
 2009 Illinois Arts Council 
 2008 National Poetry Series
 2002 New York / New England Award

Published works
Full-Length Poetry Collections

  

Anthology Publications
 All Green''
———————
Notes

References

External links 
 
 Indiana University faculty website

Year of birth missing (living people)
Living people
African-American poets
American poets
Southern Illinois University alumni
Writers from Eugene, Oregon
Poets from Illinois
Poets from Oregon
Indiana University faculty
Bavarian emigrants to the United States
Articles containing video clips
21st-century African-American people